This sortable list contains all 188 nature reserves in Schleswig-Holstein, the northernmost state in Germany (as at: 1 December 2007). Their official names and numbers are used unless otherwise stated.

References and footnotes

Sources 
 InfoNet-Umwelt Schleswig-Holstein 
 Additional environmental information from the Schleswig-Holstein State Office for Nature and the Environment